Malik Aitbar Khan (born 1 September 1953) is a Pakistani politician who had been a member of the National Assembly of Pakistan, from June 2013 to May 2018. Previously, he had been a member of the Provincial Assembly of the Punjab from 2008 to 2013.

Early life and education

He was born on 1 September 1953 in Rawalpindi.

He received early education from St. Anthony High School, Lahore and St. Mary's School, Rawalpindi. He graduated from Forman Christian College and earned a Bachelor of Arts degree.

Political career
Khan was elected to the Provincial Assembly of the Punjab as a candidate of Pakistan Muslim League (Q) (PML-Q) from Constituency PP-19 (Attock-V) in 2008 Pakistani general election. He received 41,003 votes and defeated a candidate of Pakistan Muslim League (N) (PML-N).

He was elected to the National Assembly of Pakistan as a candidate of PML-N from Constituency NA-58 (Attock-II) in 2013 Pakistani general election. He received 85,244 votes and defeated a candidate of Pakistan Tehreek-e-Insaf.

References

Living people
Pakistan Muslim League (N) politicians
Punjabi people
Pakistani MNAs 2013–2018
People from Attock District
1953 births
Punjab MPAs 2008–2013